Aremark is a municipality in Viken county, Norway. The administrative centre of the municipality is the village of Fosby.

Aremark was established as a municipality on 1 January 1838 (see formannskapsdistrikt). The new municipality of Øymark was separated from Aremark on 1 July 1903.

General information

Name 
The Norse form of the name was Aramǫrk. The first element is the genitive of the name of the lake Ari (now Aremarksjøen). (The name of the lake is probably derived from ari which means "eagle", thus "eagle lake".) The last element is mǫrk f 'woodland, borderland' (see March).

Coat-of-arms 
The coat-of-arms is from modern times. They were granted on 7 November 1986.  The arms show two blue-colored elk on a silver background. The elk was chosen as a symbol because of the large forests and the many animals in the area.

(See also the coat-of-arms for Namsos, Namsskogan, Ringsaker and Tynset.)

Economy 
Farming and forestry are the two top components of Aremark's economy.

Culture 
Every two years in Aremark there is a relatively large festival: Elgfestivalen (elk festival). It is held in a festivity area at Kirkeng Camping. It has been arranged every two years since September 1998. The festival begins Friday afternoon and lasts until Sunday afternoon.

Religion 
There are two chapels/churches in Aremark. Aremark church, which is located near Kirkeng(Church meadow), and Holmgil chapel in Bjørkebekk (Birch creek).

Television 
Aremark has been used in several movie titles and in television.  The Norwegian movies "Folk flest bor i Kina" (Most people live in China) and "Celofan" are both filmed in the municipality. The reality show "Farmen" is filmed at Bøensæther husmannsplass close to Marker.

Sister cities 
The following cities are twinned with Aremark:
  - Dzērbene, Cēsis District, Latvia

Notable people 

 Hieronymus Heyerdahl (1773 in Aremark – 1847) a Norwegian minister and politician
 Ludvig Ludvigsen Daae (1834 in Aremark – 1910) a Norwegian historian, author and professor 
 Kristofer Randers (1851 in Aremark – 1917) a Norwegian poet and theatre critic
 Ole Hallesby (1879 in Aremark – 1961) a conservative Lutheran theologian and author
 Ole Svendsen Iglerød (1784 in Aremark – 1872) a Norwegian soldier, farmer and politician
 Eyolf Soot (1859 in Aremark – 1928) a Norwegian painter
 Olaf Johannessen (1886 in Aremark – 1943) a Norwegian rifle shooter, twice team silver medallist and team bronze medallist at the 1920 Summer Olympics
 Ruth Vatvedt Fjeld (born 1948 in Aremark) a Norwegian linguist and academic

Gallery

References

External links 

 Municipal fact sheet from Statistics Norway
 
 Municipal website 

 
Municipalities of Østfold
Municipalities of Viken (county)
Populated places established in 1838
1838 establishments in Norway